The molecular formula C2H3N3 may refer to:

 Triazole
 1,2,3-Triazole
 1,2,4-Triazole

External links